Veljko Mandić (10 October 1924 – 19 November 1988) was a Montenegrin actor. He appeared in more than fifty films from 1955 to 1988.

Selected filmography

References

External links 

1924 births
1988 deaths
Actors from Nikšić
Yugoslav male actors
Serbs of Montenegro
Serbian male film actors